City Interchange, formerly City Bus Station is located in the central business district of Canberra. It is a major connecting point for Transport Canberra services across the ACT, as well as commuter bus services to surrounding areas in New South Wales. Bus stands are located on Alinga Street, East Row and Mort Street, while light rail platforms are located in the median on Northbourne Avenue. The Jolimont Centre, which serves as a station for long-distance, interstate coach services is located to the west of Northbourne Avenue, within easy walking distance of all stands and platforms.

History
Construction began in January 1982 with the station opening on 23 November 1982 replacing a temporary stabling facility on the Jolimont Centre site. Buses had previously stopped in Northbourne Avenue and London Circuit, but these stops were not separated from general traffic.

Initially only served by ACTION, from January 1999 Deane's Buslines (now Qcity Transit) and Transborder Express began providing services. Having been named City Bus Station since it opened, in April 2019 it was renamed City Interchange  coinciding with the opening of stage 1 of Canberra's light rail network.

Services
City Interchange is currently served by the following routes:

References

External links

Bus stations in Australia
Bus transport in Canberra
Transport buildings and structures in the Australian Capital Territory
Transport infrastructure completed in 1982
1982 establishments in Australia